The 2020 Friendship and Solidarity Competition was an artistic gymnastics competition hosted by the International Gymnastics Federation and held in Tokyo, Japan on November 8, 2020.  The competition implemented strict COVID-19 safety protocols that could serve as a foundation for holding the Tokyo Summer Olympic Games slated to begin July 23, 2021.

Background 
After the COVID-19 pandemic caused the mass majority of competitions in 2020 to be canceled and the 2020 Summer Olympics to be postponed until 2021, the FIG organized this event as a showcase of international camaraderie "at a time when unity has never seemed more important".  A primary goal of the competition was to prove that staging a high-profile event in Tokyo is possible in the current context of the ongoing pandemic.

Participants 
Gymnasts from Japan, China, Russia, and the United States participated in the competition.  Each federation was allowed to send eight athletes, 4 men and 4 women, although the United States opted to only send six athletes.

Medal summary

Team scores 
Only the top 3 scores per apparatus counted towards the team's total score.

References 

Friendship
2020 in Japanese sport
Friendship and Solidarity Competition